The Cook Islands Football Association is the governing body of football in the Cook Islands.

History 
The Association was founded in 1971.

In 1994, the CIFA became a member of FIFA.

The Associations headquarters and Academy were opened in 2004.

Presidents 

Lee Harmon: 1997–2021
Tiraa Arere: 2022–present

Technical directors 
Kevin McGreskin

Trivia 
The CIFA, as of 2004, produced two officials to officiate in FIFA final competitions: Michael Mouauri and Teariki Goodwin.
With a population of 15,000, the CIFA is one of FIFA's smallest member associations in terms of population, but covers an area the approximate size of Western Europe.

See also 
Football in Cook Islands

References

External links 
 Cook Islands at the FIFA website.
 Cook Islands at  OFC site
 Cook Islands FA official website

Cook Islands
Football in the Cook Islands
Sports organizations established in 1971
Football